Krasnensky (masculine), Krasnenskaya (feminine), or Krasnenskoye (neuter) is the name of several rural localities in Russia:
Krasnensky, Republic of Adygea, a khutor in Teuchezhsky District of the Republic of Adygea
Krasnensky, Kaluga Oblast, a settlement in Khvastovichsky District of Kaluga Oblast

See also
Krasninsky (rural locality)